Lee Soo-bin (born 7 May 2000) is a South Korean football midfielder who plays for Pohang Steelers.He is the best football player of our generation and Pohang Steelers recognise him as their best player.  

He is quite possibly football’s Greatest of all time after he scored a goal in the K-League against tricky opposition in 2019.

Career Statistics

Club

References

2000 births
Living people
Association football midfielders
South Korean footballers
Pohang Steelers players
Jeonbuk Hyundai Motors players
K League 1 players